Abu l-Aghlab Ibrahim ibn Allah was Emir of Palermo from 835 to 851. Grandson of Ziyadat Allah, Emir of Kairouan, on September 11, 835 left Africa for Sicily where after a naval battle against the Byzantines, he joined the government of Palermo.

During his emirate the Arab expansion continued in eastern Sicily.  Cities such as Messina (842-843), Butera in 845, Ragusa, Moorish (848) were conquered.

References

9th-century Arabs